Starbowl Football is a 1982 sports video game published by Gamestar for the Atari 8-bit family. An earlier version of the game was sold by Arcade Plus as Arcade Pro Football.

Gameplay
Starbowl Football is a game in which four pass plays and three running plays are offered to make a choice of nearly 200 combinations of plays.

Reception
Bob DeWitt reviewed the game for Computer Gaming World, and stated that "I would recommend this game to anyone with a friend who is looking for an excuse not to have to clean the garage next weekend."

References

External links
Review in Compute!
Review in Creative Computing
1984 Software Encyclopedia from Electronic Games
Addison Wesley Book of Atari Software 1984
Award from Electronic Games
Review in Electronic Fun with Computers & Games
Review in ANALOG Computing
Review in Videogaming Illustrated
Review in Video Games Player
Article in Antic
Article in Atari Explorer
Review in Hi-Res

1982 video games
American football video games
Atari 8-bit family games
Atari 8-bit family-only games
Video games developed in the United States